Critical Role is a web series in which a group of professional voice actors broadcast their Dungeons & Dragons game via Twitch and YouTube.

 Critical Role (campaign one), the first season of the web series
 Critical Role (campaign two), the second season of the web series
 Critical Role (campaign three), the third season of the web series

Critical Role may also refer to:
Critical Role: Vox Machina Origins, a comic book series that serves as a prequel to the first campaign of the web series
Critical Role Productions, the studio company setup by the cast to produce the web series and manage the cast's intellectual property rights in relation to the series

See also
The Legend of Vox Machina (working title Critical Role: The Legend of Vox Machina), the animated series based on the first campaign of the web series